The Roland D2 Groovebox is a performance-oriented Groovebox (sequencer/sound module). It has Roland's D-Field Controller technology. It has all of the Roland MC-505 sounds and a similar sequencer. All of the MFX effects have sub-menus. The D2 has 100+ sub-menus to sub-sub-sub-menus, and this is why it has fewer buttons than other Grooveboxes.

It is a compact, performance-oriented Groovebox (sequencer/sound module)--sort of a smaller MC-505—designed entirely around Roland's D-Field Controller technology. It has realtime and step record modes. It has the megamix option, which is a complicated but nice feature.

This Groovebox was designed entirely around Roland’s D-Field Controller technology. The touch-sensitive pad in the center allows the user to program and modify patterns, sounds and effects. The D-Field controller offers 3 modes – Sounds, XY and Spin, which makes it an interesting device for real-time based performance. It takes its 600 preset patches and 30 preset drum kits from the MC-505 and also features a similar sequencer with 150 new preset patterns.

Features
mfx = 4band eq, spectrum, enhancer, overdrive, distortion, lo-fi, noise, radio tuning, phonograph, compressor, limiter, slicer, tremolo, phaser, chorus, space-d, tetra chorus, flanger, step flanger, short delay, auto pan, fb pitch shifter, reverb, gate reverb, isolator reverb = room 1, 2, stage 1, 2,  hall 1,2, time, bypass 200 (Hz) 8.00 (kHz), level delay = short, long, 200 (hz) 8.00 (kHz) bypass, feedback arpeggiator = x2, style 43, motif 20, beat pattern, shuffle rate, accent rate, octave range, octave shift.

References
https://rolandcorp.com.au/blog/roland-drum-machine-chronicle-1964-2016#1970

D2
Grooveboxes